Eldijana Dana Aganović-Bentsen (born 20 November 1971) is a Croatian table tennis player. She competed in the 1996 and 2000 Summer Olympics.

References

1971 births
Living people
Table tennis players at the 1996 Summer Olympics
Table tennis players at the 2000 Summer Olympics
Croatian female table tennis players
Olympic table tennis players of Croatia
People from Foča
Bosnia and Herzegovina emigrants to Croatia
Bosniaks of Croatia